Jimmy Smith (born 25 October 1971) is an Australian former professional rugby league footballer who played as a  and  in the 1990s and 2000s.

He played for the Eastern Suburbs, the Western Suburbs and the South Sydney Rabbitohs in the Winfield Cup, ARL and NRL. He also played in the Super League for the Salford City Reds.

Background
Smith was born in Young, New South Wales, Australia.

Career
After his retirement from playing Smith was kept on by the Rabbitohs in the role of media liaison officer.

Smith has since moved into the media and works for Fox Sports as a pundit and commentator. He also works in radio.

Smith studied for an Agricultural Economics degree at Sydney University.

References

1971 births
Living people
Australian rugby league players
Australian rugby league commentators
Rugby league players from Young, New South Wales
Rugby league props
Rugby league second-rows
Salford Red Devils players
South Sydney Rabbitohs players
Sydney Roosters players
Western Suburbs Magpies players